Russell James Romaniuk (born June 9, 1970) is a Canadian former professional ice hockey left winger who played in the National Hockey League (NHL) for the Winnipeg Jets and Philadelphia Flyers. He is currently co-presenting the CJOB Moose Hockey show.

Playing career
Romaniuk was born in Winnipeg, Manitoba. Drafted 31st overall by his hometown Jets in the 1988 NHL Entry Draft, Romaniuk played 102 regular season games, scoring 13 goals and 14 assists for 27 points, collecting 63 penalty minutes.

Romaniuk spent the last few years of his career playing in Europe, playing in Germany for the Nürnberg Ice Tigers, in Italy for Brunico SG, and for the British Ice Hockey Superleague for the Manchester Storm, and the Cardiff Devils in the British National League and the Elite Ice Hockey League before retiring in 2005.

Career statistics

Regular season and playoffs

Awards and honors

References

External links
 

1970 births
Brunico SG players
Canadian ice hockey left wingers
Cardiff Devils players
Fort Wayne Komets players
Hershey Bears players
Houston Aeros (1994–2013) players
Ice hockey people from Manitoba
Las Vegas Thunder players
Living people
Long Beach Ice Dogs (IHL) players
Manchester Storm (1995–2002) players
St. Boniface Saints (ice hockey) players
Manitoba Moose (IHL) players
Moncton Hawks players
North Dakota Fighting Hawks men's ice hockey players
Nürnberg Ice Tigers players
Philadelphia Flyers players
Springfield Falcons players
Winnipeg Jets (1979–1996) draft picks
Winnipeg Jets (1979–1996) players
HC Pustertal Wölfe players
Canadian expatriate ice hockey players in England
Canadian expatriate ice hockey players in Wales
Canadian expatriate ice hockey players in Italy
Canadian expatriate ice hockey players in Germany
Canadian expatriate ice hockey players in the United States